The 2004 Illinois Democratic -presidential primary was held on March 16 in the U.S. state of Illinois as one of the Democratic Party's statewide nomination contests ahead of the 2004 presidential election.

Results

References

Illinois
Democratic presidential primary
2004